Yaequinolone J1 is an antibiotic made by Penicillium.

Total syntheses of yaequinolone J1
An asymmetric total synthesis of yaequinolone J1 has been published in 2018 by V. Vece, S. Jakkepally and S. Hanessian. In 2020, a five-step synthesis of yaequinolone J1 was reported.

References

Antibiotics
Yaequinolone J1